In Colorado, State Highway 400 may refer to:
U.S. Route 400 in Colorado, a second designation for part of US 50
Colorado State Highway 400 (1950s) north of Fort Collins